SÁM 66 (Stofnun Árna Magnússonar á Íslandi) is an 18th-century manuscript now at the Árni Magnússon Institute for Icelandic Studies, Iceland. Reference information and a copy of this manuscript can be found online.  This book was written in Iceland in 1765 and 1766. The back cover is dated 1765.  The text follows that of earlier manuscripts and printed books. However the book contains a nice collection of illustrated pages on pages 73-80 (many of which are reproduced below).

References 

Literary illuminated manuscripts
Icelandic art
Icelandic manuscripts
Árni Magnússon Institute for Icelandic Studies collection
1765 books
18th-century manuscripts

References